Paul Hogan (born 30 August 1963) is an English professional darts player who plays in events of the World Darts Federation. He is nicknamed "Crocodile Dundee" after the film starring his namesake, Australian actor Paul Hogan.

Career
Hogan made his World Championship debut in 1995, reaching the quarter finals. He beat Per Skau and Sean Palfrey before losing to Richie Burnett who went on to win the tournament. He returned the next year but couldn't repeat his performance of twelve months earlier, losing in the first round to Matt Clark. He failed to qualify for 1997 and 98 but did so for the 1999 World Championship, but again lost in the first round to Colin Monk. It wouldn't be until 2004 where Hogan would return to the Lakeside, beating Bob Taylor in the first round but lost in the second round to then-reigning World Champion Raymond van Barneveld. In 2006, he equalled his best performance at the Lakeside with a quarter-final place. He beat Dutchmen Mareno Michels and Albertino Essers in the first two rounds before losing to another Dutchman Jelle Klaasen who, like Burnett 11 years earlier, was the eventual champion. Hogan returned in 2007, but lost in the first round to Shaun Greatbatch. Hogan subsequently failed to qualify for several years afterwards.

Hogan has also reached the last 32 stage of the Winmau World Masters on three occasions, in 1989, 1998 , 2003 and 2014. Hogan also played in the UK Open in 2003, losing in the second round to Terry Jenkins.

2005 saw Hogan claim his maiden Open Tournament, winning the British Classic, gaining wins over John Walton, Steve Farmer, Mike Veitch, and Jamie Caven before beating Gary Anderson in the final.

Hogan was less prolific in the years that followed, but he caused a surprise by coming through the qualifiers for the 2014 BDO World Darts Championship, his first qualification for the Lakeside tournament in seven years. He won his preliminary game against Karel Sedláček before being defeated 3–2 by Scott Mitchell despite hitting finishes of 161, 141, and 90 on the bullseye when Mitchell first threw for the match. Hogan followed up this success with a strong showing at the 2014 UK Open, notably beating three-time world champion John Part 5–0 in the opening session and following it up with a 9–3 win over Benito van de Pas to become the first player to reach the fourth round.

Paul Hogan qualified for the 2015 UK Open for which he had another good run defeating Lee Russell, Derek Bland, Darren Johnson and Benito van de Pas before losing to World Number 1 Michael van Gerwen in a high quality affair 9–4.

Hogan has since competed on the PDC Challenge Tour Circuit. He recently won the Benidorm Open.

Hogan returned to prominence at the 2017 BDO World Darts Championship when he beat Martin Phillips to face world number one Glen Durrant and almost caused a huge upset. Hogan won 11 of the first 13 legs of the match to lead 3–0 in sets and 2–0 in legs. Needing one leg to win and with 16 points required, Hogan hit double-16 to bust his score and Durrant made a sensational comeback to win 4–3. Durrant went on to win the title.

Hogan rebounded by once again qualifying for the UK Open at Minehead, where he defeated Keegan Brown and Jamie Lewis in the opening two rounds, before upsetting back-to-back two-time world champions Gary Anderson and Adrian Lewis to reach the last 16. He was beaten by eventual runner-up Gerwyn Price.

Over the weekend of the 25 and 26 March Hogan represented England in the BDO British Internationals. On Saturday 25th, Paul Hogan defeated Martin Phillips of Wales 4–3 in legs with a 30.10 1-dart average (90.30 3-dart) as part of a 12–0 whitewash for England over their Welsh counterparts. On the 26th England defeated Scotland 10–2 to win the title, Hogan's 4–1 victory over Alan Soutar will be remembered for the 9-darter he threw in the 5th and final leg.

Hogan again qualified for the UK Open at Minehead. He beat Darren Brown, Paul Nicholson and Jeffrey de Zwaan before losing a close last 16 match against Gerwyn Price 10–9.

Paul Hogan qualified for another World Championship in the 2019 BDO World Darts Championship, where he lost in first round. In the 2020 BDO World Darts Championship he made a third quarter-final in a third different decade only to lose to Jim Williams 5–1.

World Championship results

BDO/WDF
 1995: Quarter-finals (lost to Richie Burnett 2–4)
 1996: First round (lost to Matt Clark 2–3)
 1999: First round (lost to Colin Monk 2–3)
 2004: Second round (lost to Raymond van Barneveld 1–3)
 2006: Quarter-finals (lost to Jelle Klaasen 4–5)
 2007: First round (lost to Shaun Greatbatch 1–3)
 2014: First round (lost to Scott Mitchell 2–3)
 2017: Second round (lost to Glen Durrant 3–4)
 2019: First round (lost to Willem Mandigers 0–3)
 2020: Quarter-finals (lost to Jim Williams 1–5)
 2022: First round (lost to Justin Thompson 1–2)

Career statistics

(W) Won; (F) finalist; (SF) semifinalist; (QF) quarterfinalist; (#R) rounds 6, 5, 4, 3, 2, 1; (RR) round-robin stage; (Prel.) Preliminary round; (DNQ) Did not qualify; (DNP) Did not participate; (NH) Not held

Performance timeline

References

External links
Paul Hogan's Profile and Stats on Darts Database

English darts players
Living people
1963 births
Place of birth missing (living people)
British Darts Organisation players
Professional Darts Corporation associate players